The Kochi Jain temple or Dharmanath Jain temple is a Jain temple in the Mattancherry in Kochi, Kerala.

History 
Historically, Jains from Kutch & Saurastra used to come to Cochin, Kozhikode and Alleppey for business. This temple was built in 1904 CE (VS 1960) by Hirubhai Jivraj Dhanji constructed this temple in memory of her husband Jivraj Dhanji.

Architecture 
This temple is one of the major Jain pilgrimage site of India. The temple is beautifully tiled with white marble and adorned with artworks, sculptured pillars and idols of Tirthankaras. The mulnayak of the temple is an idol of Dharmanatha, the 15th tirthankara. The temple architecture is inspired by the Jain temples of Gujarat. There is another Jain temple dedicated to Chandraprabha within the temple complex.

Festival 
Paryushan festival is annually organised in temple to observe an eight-day self purification festival - Paryushan.

See also 
 Jainism in Kerala

References

Citations

General sources

External links

Jain temples in Kerala
20th-century Jain temples
Kochi